David Thurwell Hammond (January 5, 1881 – February 3, 1940) was an American freestyle swimmer and water polo player who competed in the 1904 Summer Olympics. In the 1904 Olympics he won two silver medals as a member of American 4x50 yard freestyle relay team and as a member of Chicago Athletic Association water polo team.

See also
 List of athletes with Olympic medals in different disciplines
 List of Olympic medalists in swimming (men)

References

External links
 

1881 births
1940 deaths
American male freestyle swimmers
American male water polo players
Olympic medalists in water polo
Olympic silver medalists for the United States in swimming
Olympic water polo players of the United States
Water polo players from Chicago
Swimmers at the 1904 Summer Olympics
Water polo players at the 1904 Summer Olympics
Medalists at the 1904 Summer Olympics
Swimmers from Chicago